Alsobacter is a genus of Alphaproteobacteria.

References

Hyphomicrobiales
Bacteria genera